Mane Number 13 is a 2020 Indian Kannada-language horror thriller film directed by Vivy Kathiresan and produced by Krishna Chaitanya under the banner of Sri Swarnalatha Productions. It stars Ramana, Sanjeev, Praveen Prem, Varsha Bollamma and Aishwarya Gowda. The film was simultaneously made in Tamil as 13aam Number Veedu.
The film was released via streaming on Amazon Prime Video on 26 November 2020.

Cast 
 Ramana as Nishok
 Sanjeev as Aswanth
 Praveen Prem as Karthick
 Varsha Bollamma as Nancy
 Aishwarya Gowda as Preethi
 Chethan Gandarva as Ram
 Sathvika Appaiah as Ahalya

Release
The film after delay due to COVID-19 pandemic, was released on Amazon Prime Video on 26 November 2020, as direct-to-video platform.

Reception 
Sowmya Rajendran reviewing for The News Minute criticized the screenplay as "series of unimaginative scares, with no effort to build the suspense or create tension". He opines that it is horror in itself that the film was made. He concludes that stream the film only if there is a compelling reason and if anyone wants some scares, "... be warned, there is no boo, only boohoo."

References

External links

Amazon Prime Video original films
2020 direct-to-video films
2020 films
Films not released in theaters due to the COVID-19 pandemic
Indian horror thriller films
2020 horror thriller films
2020s Kannada-language films